Soviet War Memorials are memorials commemorating the activities of Soviet Armed Forces in any of the wars involving Soviet Union, most notably World War II. After the dissolution of the Soviet Union and the 2022 Russian invasion of Ukraine, many of the memorials, especially the ones dedicated to the activities of Soviet Armed Forces during the World War II in former Soviet Bloc countries, have been removed, relocated, altered or have had their meaning reinterpreted (such as the Liberty Statue in Budapest).

Austria

 Soviet War Memorial (Vienna)

Bulgaria
 Alyosha Monument, Plovdiv
 Monument to the Soviet Army, Sofia
 , Byala Slatina

China
 
 
 , Shengyang
 Monument to the Soviet Army Martyrs in the

Czech Republic

 Monument to Soviet Tank Crews (first painted, later removed)
 Statue of Ivan Konev (removed in 2020)
  (removed in 1991)

Germany
 Soviet War Memorial (Treptower Park), a memorial in Treptower Park, Berlin
 Soviet War Memorial (Tiergarten), a memorial in Tiergarten, Berlin
 Soviet War Memorial (Schönholzer Heide), a memorial in Schönholzer Heide, Berlin

Estonia

 Bronze Soldier of Tallinn (relocated to Tallinn Military Cemetery in 2007)
  (removed in 2022)
  (removed in 2022)
  (removed in 2022)

Hungary
 Liberty Statue (Budapest), the Soviet inscription has been replaced
 Liberty Square (Budapest)
 Hungarian-Soviet Friendship Memorial, now in Memento Park

Latvia

 Monument to the Liberators of Soviet Latvia and Riga from the German Fascist Invaders (removed in 2022)

North Korea
 Liberation Monument, Pyongyang

Poland
After 2017, Poland's Law and Justice (PiS) government destroyed most of the Soviet War Memorials in Poland.
 
 Monument to Brotherhood in Arms, Warsaw (removed in 2011)
  (removed in 2018)
  (removed in 2018)
  (removed in 2022)
  (removed in 2019)
  (removed in 2022)
  (removed in 2014)
  (removed in 2018)
  (removed in 2017)
 Soviet Military Cemetery, Warsaw

Romania

Other
Joseph Stalin is still quoted in stone in German and Russian at least in Treptow and Vienna. Such inscriptions have been generally removed in Soviet Union and Soviet block countries.

References

Soviet military memorials and cemeteries
World War II memorials